Odessa is a census-designated place (CDP) in Pasco County, Florida, United States. The population was 3,173 at the 2000 census and more than doubled to 7,267 in 2010. Northwest of Tampa, Odessa had been an area of open spaces, ranching, and horse properties. More recently it has seen many suburban property developments as Tampa's population expands.

History 
The Odessa area was first settled in the middle 1800s by the W.M. Mobley Family who migrated from Savannah, Georgia. Odessa was named in the 1880s by Peter Demens, a Russian immigrant who developed the community through the Orange Belt Railway.   Later, the railroad came through, running parallel with S.R. 54. Demens also founded St. Petersburg, Florida and named both communities after places he used to go to in his native country.

There was once a large sawmill in the area providing employment. This sawmill replaced some smaller ones and was burned in a fire in 1922.

The area is rapidly being developed as Tampa expands.

Odessa was home to Tampa Bay Executive Airport until 2004.

Geography

Odessa is located at  (28.183446, -82.568456).

The USPS mailing area that uses the city of Odessa stretches into Hillsborough County and overlaps parts of Keystone, a separate CDP located entirely in Hillsborough County. This apparent overlap is due to USPS ZIP code designation only; the two CDPs do not actually overlap - no part of Odessa is truly in Hillsborough County.

Demographics

As of the census of 2000, there were 3,173 people, 1,181 households, and 896 families residing in the CDP. The racial makeup of the CDP was 95.93% White, 0.66% African American, 0.57% Native American, 0.72% Asian, 0.03% Pacific Islander, 0.91% from other races, and 1.17% from two or more races. Hispanic or Latino of any race were 6.81% of the population.

There were 1,181 households, out of which 35.1% had children under the age of 18 living with them, 62.8% were married couples living together, 8.6% had a female householder with no husband present, and 24.1% were non-families. 18.0% of all households were made up of individuals, and 4.1% had someone living alone who was 65 years of age or older.  The average household size was 2.69 and the average family size was 3.04.

In the CDP, the population was spread out, with 24.9% under the age of 18, 7.0% from 18 to 24, 32.1% from 25 to 44, 27.6% from 45 to 64, and 8.4% who were 65 years of age or older.  The median age was 39 years. For every 100 females, there were 108.3 males.  For every 100 females age 18 and over, there were 104.8 males.

The median income for a household in the CDP was $45,864, and the median income for a family was $55,461. Males had a median income of $38,992 versus $26,818 for females. The per capita income for the CDP was $21,548.  About 3.7% of families and 6.7% of the population were below the poverty line, including 10.4% of those under age 18 and 11.5% of those age 65 or over.

Notable people
Jay Feely
Chris Jericho
Carl Nicks
Nate Pearson
Vinny Testaverde

References

External links
Trinity and Odessa Florida Information
History of Odessa

Census-designated places in Pasco County, Florida
Census-designated places in Florida